The Big Red Songbook is a collection of Wobbly songs compiled by folklorist Archie Green.  The 2016 edition was co-edited by Green, labor historian David Roediger, Franklin Rosemount, and Salvatore Solerno. It features an introduction by Tom Morello, and an afterword by Utah Phillips.

References

External links
 Industrial Workers' Songbook Gets Big Update Ann Goodman (National Public Radio, 2006-09-04)

Song books
History of labor relations in the United States
Industrial Workers of the World publications
2007 non-fiction books
Trade union songs